POU domain, class 3, transcription factor 2 is a protein that in humans is encoded by the POU3F2 gene.

Function 

N-Oct-3 is a protein belonging to a large family of transcription factors that bind to the octameric DNA sequence ATGCAAAT. Most of these proteins share a highly homologous region, referred to as the POU domain, which occurs in several mammalian transcription factors, including the octamer-binding proteins Oct1 (POU2F1; MIM 164175) and Oct2 (POU2F2; MIM 164176), and the pituitary protein Pit1 (PIT1; MIM 173110).

Class III POU genes are expressed predominantly in the CNS. It is likely that CNS-specific transcription factors such as these play an important role in mammalian neurogenesis by regulating their diverse patterns of gene expression.

Disease linkage 

The POU3F2 protein associates with the Bipolar disorder. It is involved in the neocortex development in mice, and is linked to a single nucleotide polymorphism, Rs1906252, that is associated with a cognitive phenotype: processing information speed.

Chromosome 6q16.1 deletions resulting in loss of one copy of POU3F2 have been shown to cause a human syndrome of susceptibility to obesity and variable levels of developmental delay and Intellectual Disability.

Interactions 

POU3F2 has been shown to interact with PQBP1.

See also 
 Octamer transcription factor

References

Further reading

External links 
 

POU-domain proteins